Konijeti Rosaiah (4 July 1933 – 4 December 2021) was an Indian politician who served as the 15th chief minister of United Andhra Pradesh from 2009 to 2010. He also served as the Governor of Tamil Nadu from 2011 to 2016 and the Governor of Karnataka  (additional charge) for two months. He was previously an MLC, MLA and MP from the Indian National Congress numerous times and handled many ministerial posts over his long political career spanning over half a century.

While serving as Governor of Tamil Nadu, he was also given additional responsibility as Governor of Karnataka when Governor H. R. Bhardwaj's term ended on 28 June 2014, until Vajubhai Vala took over on 1 September 2014. After completion of his five-year term as Governor of Tamil Nadu he took retirement from active politics.

Early life
Konijeti Rosaiah was born into a Telugu-speaking, middle-class Hindu Gavara Komati Vaishya family in Vemuru, Tenali mandal, present day Guntur District, in Andhra Pradesh. He graduated from Guntur Hindu College, Andhra University in
Commerce. While he was studying in Guntur, he was elected as the student leader and thus entered into politics. He studied at Zilla Parishad High School.

Political career
Rosaiah began as a political disciple of Swatantra Party leader and independence activist N.G. Ranga. He was elected as MLC in 1968, 1974, 1980 and 2009 and as an MLA in 1989 and 2004 from Chirala assembly constituency. In 1998, he was elected as MP from Narasaraopet. In the year 2011 he was sworn in as Governor of Tamil Nadu. During his long political career he interacted and worked closely with most of the Prime Ministers of India, including Jawaharlal Nehru.

Ministerial portfolios held
 AP State Minister for Transportation and Roads and Buildings under M. Chenna Reddy from 1978.
 AP State Minister for Transportation and Housing under T. Anjaiah from 1980.
 AP State Minister for Home under Kotla Vijaya Bhasker Reddy from 1982.
 AP State Minister for Finance, Transportation and Electricity under M. Chenna Reddy from 1989.
 AP State Minister for Finance, Medical & Health, Education and Electricity under Nedurumalli Janardhana Reddy from Dec 1990.
 AP State Minister for Finance, Medical & Health, Education and Electricity under Kotla Vijaya Bhaskara Reddy from Oct 1992.
 AP State Minister for Finance, Planning & Legislative Affairs under Y. S. Rajasekhara Reddy from April 2004.

As APCC President 
Rosaiah was the President of the Andhra Pradesh Congress Committee (APCC) from 1994 to 1996.

As Finance Minister
Rosaiah presented the state budget 16 times, including 7 times in a row, a record in the country. He served as a finance minister under Marri Chenna Reddy, Kotla Vijaya Bhaskara Reddy, Nedurumalli Janardhana Reddy and Y. S. Rajashekhara Reddy. In his tenure as Finance Minister in Chenna Reddy's cabinet, he ensured that teachers received retirement benefits. Rosaiah is well known for adhering to strict fiscal management principles and effective mobilization & utilization of government funds. His contribution to the state as its longest serving finance minister is well recognized.

As Chief Minister
Rosaiah took over as the Chief Minister after the death of Y. S. Rajashekhara Reddy. In his tenure, Konijeti strived to bring political stability to the state and continue all the welfare programs planned and initiated by his predecessor. He is often credited with the effective management of the flood situation during October 2009, the law and order situation with respect to the Telangana agitation which started in December 2010, effective budgetary management, streamlining of the delivery systems of welfare programs etc.  He submitted his resignation as Chief Minister to the Governor of Andhra Pradesh, ESL Narasimhan on 24 November 2010 citing health reasons.

Political History

As per the Information submitted to Parliament Office, as Member of Parliament of 12th Lok Sabha the following positions were held by him:

1968-85 Member, Andhra Pradesh Legislative Council

1979-83 Minister, Roads and Buildings, Housing, Transport and Home, Andhra Pradesh

1989-94 Member, Andhra Pradesh Legislative Assembly and Minister, Finance and Transport, Andhra Pradesh

1992-93 Leader of House, Andhra Pradesh Legislative Assembly

1998 Elected to 12th Lok Sabha

1998-99 Member, Committee on Industry and Member, Library Committee and Member, Consultative Committee, Ministry of
		Information and Broadcasting

He retired from active politics in August 2016, after completion of his term as Governor of Tamil Nadu. His political career lasted around 60 years.

Honours
Andhra University conferred Rosaiah with an honorary doctorate in 2007.

Personal life

He was married on 4 June 1950 to Smt Sivalakshmi. He has 3 sons and 1 daughter. His sons are KS Subba Rao and KSN Murthy and daughter is P Rama Devi. His socio-cultural activities include helping the under-privileged. He was also a good orator. He was also member of the spices board in the year 1998. His professions include agriculturist, trader and industrialist.

Rosaiah died on 4 December 2021 at the age of 88 in Hyderabad, Telangana after a brief illness. The Government of Andhra Pradesh and the Government of Telangana observed a three-day state mourning as a mark of respect to him. He was cremated with full state honours at his farmhouse in Kompally on 5 December 2021.

See also
 List of Chief Ministers of Andhra Pradesh
 List of Governors of Tamil Nadu

References

1933 births
2021 deaths
Indian National Congress politicians from Andhra Pradesh
Chief Ministers of Andhra Pradesh
People from Guntur
Governors of Tamil Nadu
Governors of Karnataka
Lok Sabha members from Andhra Pradesh
India MPs 1998–1999
Andhra University alumni